KJLS is a radio station airing a Hot AC format licensed to Hays, Kansas, United States, broadcasting on 103.3 MHz FM.  The station is owned by Eagle Communications, Inc.

In 1974, when FM radio was relatively new, Kansas radio entrepreneur and personality Larry Steckline established KJLS (whose call sign ends in Steckline's initials) as a country-western music station. According to Steckline, it was the first FM station to survive west of U.S. Highway 81 (the north-south highway in the center of the nation).

References

External links
KJLS's webpage

Hot adult contemporary radio stations in the United States
JLS